Aisake Tarogi (born 15 February 1981 in Suva, Fiji) is a Fijian rugby union player. He plays prop for French club, Le Bugue.

Career
Tarogi debuted for Fiji against Japan at Suva on July 3, 2009. He last played for Fiji in a test match against Romania at Bucharest on November 28, 2009.

External links
 Profile of Aisake Tarogi

1981 births
Living people
Fijian rugby union players
Fiji international rugby union players
Fijian expatriate rugby union players
Expatriate rugby union players in France
Fijian expatriate sportspeople in France
Sportspeople from Suva
Rugby union props